Thomas Alexander McCall (born 1951) is a New Zealand former cricket umpire. He stood in two ODI games in 1985.

See also
 List of One Day International cricket umpires

References

1951 births
Living people
New Zealand One Day International cricket umpires